Bezirk Mürzzuschlag is a former district of the state of Styria in Austria. Mürzzuschlag merged with the district of Bruck an der Mur to form the new district Bruck-Mürzzuschlag on January 1, 2013.

Municipalities
Suburbs, hamlets and other subdivisions of a municipality are indicated in small characters.
 Allerheiligen im Mürztal
Edelsdorf, Jasnitz, Leopersdorf, Sölsnitz, Wieden
 Altenberg an der Rax
Altenberg, Greith, Steinalpl
 Ganz
Auersbach, Eichhorntal, Lambach, Schöneben
 Kapellen
Raxen, Stojen
 Kindberg
 Krieglach
Alpl, Freßnitz, Freßnitzgraben, Krieglach-Schwöbing, Malleisten, Massing, Sommer
 Langenwang
Feistritzberg, Hönigsberg, Langenwang-Schwöbing, Lechen, Mitterberg, Pretul, Traibach
 Mitterdorf im Mürztal
Lutschaun
 Mürzhofen
 Mürzsteg
Dobrein, Dürrenthal, Frein an der Mürz, Kaltenbach, Lanau, Niederalpl, Scheiterboden, Tebrin
 Mürzzuschlag
Auersbach, Edlach, Hönigsberg, Kohleben, Lambach, Pernreit, Schöneben
 Neuberg an der Mürz
Alpl, Arzbach, Dorf, Krampen, Lechen, Neudörfl, Veitschbach
 Spital am Semmering
Steinhaus am Semmering
 Stanz im Mürztal
Brandstatt, Dickenbach, Fladenbach, Fochnitz, Hollersbach, Possegg, Retsch, Sonnberg, Traßnitz, Unteralm
 Veitsch
Großveitsch, Kleinveitsch, Niederaigen
 Wartberg im Mürztal

References

Districts of Styria
 
States and territories disestablished in 2013